The Army Aviation Group is the army aviation unit of the Bangladesh Army. The AAG conducts military air operations and is responsible for doctrine, manning and configuration for all aviation resources in the Army.

History

Origin

The unit started its journey on 1 January 1978 as Army Aviation Flight. At that time, the army had no pilot training facilities of its own. Civil Aviation Authority, Bangladesh took up the responsibility of pilot training. Initially, the unit had no aircraft. The first aircraft in the army aviation unit were two Bell 205 helicopters gifted by Iran government in 1978. On 7 September 1979, the unit was upgraded to Army Aviation Squadron.  On 15 July 1980, the unit got regiment strength and named Army Air Regiment. In 1982, four Cessna 152 were procured for the regiment. These were the first fixed-wing aircraft of the army aviation. In 1983, one Piper PA-31T Cheyenne aircraft was procured which was used for VIP transport purpose. On 27 November 1995, the unit was named Army Aviation. Three Bell 206 L4 helicopters and one Cessna 208 Caravan were procured later to strengthen the Aviation Group. On 20 March 2012, the unit was finally named Army Aviation Group.

Present
The strength of the unit is more than 204 with 30+ pilots. Members from all the corps of Bangladesh Army can join this unit with proper qualification and training. The unit is headquartered at the Tejgaon Airport, Dhaka. After the formulation of Forces Goal 2030, the modernisation and expansion of army aviation is going on in accordance with this goal. Following the goal, modern aircraft like Eurocopter AS365 Dauphin helicopters, C-295W transport aircraft and Mi-171Sh combat helicopters have been added to this unit. Recently six Diamond DA40 aircraft have been procured to slowly phase out the old Cessna 152s and increase training facilities. Four of these aircraft have been already added to the fleet while the rest two will join soon.

A new base for AAG was set up at Lalmonirhat Airport on 2 March 2020. This base will have the dedicated infrastructure for the Army Aviation Training School.

Army aviation maintenance workshop
This unit is responsible for the maintenance of the aircraft of the army aviation group. Previously, personnel from Bangladesh Air Force did all the maintenance task of army aviation. Later on, army came up with its own maintenance unit with its own personnel.

Aircraft

Current inventory

Future modernisation plans
Bangladesh government has adopted a total restructuring plan for the Army aviation group. As per the plan, the Army aviation group will be renamed as the Army aviation. The total manpower of the unit will be raised from 204 to 704 personnel. By 2021, the number of aircraft operated by army aviation will be twenty-six. The army aviation maintenance workshop with 147 manpower will be re-structured to army aviation engineering workshop with 490 personnel. An aviation directorate will also be formed in the army.

Army Aviation has the plan to add one more EADS CASA C-295 transport aircraft to its fleet soon. Besides, six more Mil Mi-171Sh helicopters will be procured in 2021. They also have a plan to add attack helicopters to the fleet in the near future.

See also
 Bangladesh Air Force
 Bangladesh Naval Aviation

References

Army aviation units and formations
Bangladesh Army
Aviation in Bangladesh